The 1st Tipsport Kaufland Cup was held from 7 September 2020 to 19 February 2021.

Group stage

Group A

Group B

Group C

Group D

Playoffs

Quarterfinals

First leg

Second leg

Semifinals

First leg

Second leg

Final

References

Tipsport Kaufland Cup